The Ashgabat City Telephone Network is the telecommunications company in Turkmenistan, which providing local telephone, CDMA and IPTV, service to subscribers in the city of Ashgabat. It provides long-distance and international calls, broadband access to the Internet via ADSL, and Wi-Fi services for home, business, educational institutions and foreign enterprises.

History 
Ashgabat city telephone network was registered on January 27, 1994.

Based on the decree of the President of Turkmenistan dated April 17, 2015, the Ashgabat City Telephone Network was transformed into a closed joint-stock company with the participation of the Ministry of Communications of Turkmenistan with a share in the authorized capital of 30% and the State Telecommunications Company Turkmentelecom with a share of 60%.

Services

Cable telephony 
As of 2018, the number of customers of cable telephone services reached 233,563 subscribers.

IPTV 
As of 2018, the number of customers of IPTV services totals 104,062 subscribers.

Internet 
As of 2018, the number of Internet services customers has reached 50,255 subscribers.

CDMA Network 
The CDMA network in Ashgabat was established and put into operation in 2003. Since 2010, the network equipment has been installed and commissioned in other regions of Turkmenistan. The number of users as of 2018 reaches 55, 541 subscribers.

References

External links
AŞTU - Russian language and Turkmen language

Telecommunications companies of Turkmenistan
Companies based in Ashgabat